Viktor Gruzenkin (sometimes spelled Viktor Grouzenkin) (born December 19, 1951) is a retired Soviet decathlete.  His personal record in the decathlon is 8356 points, set in Kiev in 1984.  On February 17–18, 1979 he set the world record in the Indoor Heptathlon at 5934 points, which he held for over a year, surpassing the record of Guido Kratschmer who had recently won the silver medal in the 1976 Olympics behind Bruce Jenner (now known as Caitlyn Jenner).

He continued competing into the Masters division, winning the decathlon in the M45 division at the 1997 World Championships.  His 7687 points from that meet is the current World Record.

In 1978 he had a leading role in the film Muzhskie Igry Na Svezhem Vozdukhe (roughly translated as "Men's Outdoor Play").

Personal bests

Notes

References

Soviet decathletes
1951 births
Living people
World record setters in athletics (track and field)
World record holders in masters athletics